Peangtarn "Earth" Plipuech (born 15 November 1992) is a Thai tennis player.

Plipuech has a career-high singles ranking by the Women's Tennis Association (WTA) of 175, achieved on 31 July 2017. On 10 October 2016, she peaked at No. 100 in the WTA doubles rankings. She has won two doubles titles on the WTA Challenger Tour, along with six singles and 29 doubles titles on the ITF Women's Circuit.

Her biggest success to date was at the 2013 Fifth Third Bank Tennis Championships where she and Nicha Lertpitaksinchai claimed the doubles title.

In 2016 and 2017, she reached the final in doubles of the WTA tournament in Seoul.

In 2023 she reached the semifinals at the home tournament in Hua Hin, Thailand as a wildcard with partner compatriot Luksika Kumkhum after the withdrawal of Anna Kalinskaya and Linda Fruhvirtova.

Personal life
Plipuech's sister Plobrung is a junior tennis player.

Grand Slam performance timeline

Doubles

WTA career finals

Doubles: 2 (2 runner-ups)

WTA Challenger finals

Doubles: 4 (2 titles, 2 runner-ups)

ITF finals

Singles: 15 (6 titles, 9 runner–ups)

Doubles: 54 (29 titles, 25 runner–ups)

Notes

References

 
 

1992 births
Living people
Peangtarn Plipuech
Tennis players at the 2014 Asian Games
Peangtarn Plipuech
Peangtarn Plipuech
Peangtarn Plipuech
Southeast Asian Games medalists in tennis
Tennis players at the 2018 Asian Games
Competitors at the 2015 Southeast Asian Games
Peangtarn Plipuech
Competitors at the 2017 Southeast Asian Games
Competitors at the 2019 Southeast Asian Games
LGBT tennis players
Peangtarn Plipuech
Peangtarn Plipuech